Philodromus floridensis is a species of running crab spider in the family Philodromidae. It is found in the United States.

References

floridensis
Articles created by Qbugbot
Spiders described in 1904